Kei Kobayashi (小林圭 Kobayashi Kei born 29 August 1977) is a Japanese chef and owner of the restaurant Kei in Paris 1e. His restaurant has earned three Michelin stars in 2020. He is the first Japanese chef earned three Michelin stars in France.

Kobayashi was born in Nagano. He elected to focus on French cuisine after viewing a documentary about Alain Chapel. Kobayashi trained at French restaurants in Japan before moving to France in 1998 to work with Gilles Goujon and Alain Ducasse.

References

External links
Kei's website

Japanese chefs
Head chefs of Michelin starred restaurants
Japanese expatriates in France
People from Nagano (city)
1970s births
Living people